Swan River may refer to:

Australia
 Swan River (Western Australia)
 Swan River Colony, a British settlement  on the river, later became Perth

Canada
 Swan River (Manitoba–Saskatchewan)
 Swan River, Manitoba
 Swan River Airport, servicing the town of Swan River in Manitoba
 Swan River (electoral district), a provincial electoral district in Manitoba

Pakistan
 Soan River, also spelled as Swan River

United States
 Swan River (Colorado)
 Swan River (Michigan)
 Swan River (northern Minnesota), a tributary of the Mississippi 
 Swan River (central Minnesota), a tributary of the Mississippi 
 Swan River (Montana)
 Swan River (New York), on Long Island

See also
Little Swan River (disambiguation)
Swan (disambiguation)